The 2008 Damxung earthquake hit Damxung County, Xizang (Tibet), west of Lhasa, in the People's Republic of China around 16:30 China Standard Time on October 6. The Chinese state media reported that the earthquake caused 10 deaths as of October 7. Three aftershocks above magnitude 5 followed.

The 2008 Damxung earthquake struck further southwest than the similar 1952 Damxung earthquake.

See also
List of earthquakes in 2008
List of earthquakes in China

References

External links

Damxung earthquake
Damxung earthquake
Earthquakes in Tibet
October 2008 events in China
Damxung County